Sania Mirza was the defending champion and top seed, but was stunned by Camille Pin in the second round.

In the final, Mara Santangelo defeated the Jelena Kostanić to win her title 3–6, 7–6(7–5), 6–3.

Seeds

Draw

Finals

Top half

Bottom half

References

2006 WTA Tour
Bangalore Open